Cheung Chau South was one of the constituencies in the Islands District in the New Territories, Hong Kong.

The constituency returned one district councillor to the Islands District Council, with an election every four years.

Cheung Chau South constituency was loosely based on the southern part of the island of Cheung Chau with an estimated population of 11,108.

Councillors represented

Election results

2010s

2000s

1990s

References

Cheung Chau
Constituencies of Hong Kong
Constituencies of Islands District Council
1994 establishments in Hong Kong
Constituencies established in 1994
2019 disestablishments in Hong Kong
Constituencies disestablished in 2019